The R.E.B.I.R.T.H. is a 2007 album by hip hop artist One Be Lo.

The album features production entirely from outside producers (as opposed to his label mates from Subterraneous Records like from previous projects). The producers list includes Texture & 14KT (from Lab Techs / Athletic Mic League), K Krueser, Memo (of the Molemen), Jake One, Bean One, Vitamin D, Eric G., and D.L. Jones

The acronym R.E.B.I.R.T.H. stands for "Real Emcee's Bring Intelligent Rhymes To Hip-Hop".

Track listing

Notes
Track 11 (Gray):
Saxophone By Dave McMurray
Electric Piano By Scott Summer

References

2007 albums
One Be Lo albums
Albums produced by Jake One